Kobilščak is a small settlement in the hills south of Radenci in northeastern Slovenia.

References

External links
Kobilščak on Geopedia

Populated places in the Municipality of Radenci